Alfarnatejo is a town and municipality in the province of Málaga, part of the autonomous community of Andalusia in southern Spain. The municipality is situated approximately 50 km from the city of Málaga. It has a population of approximately 400 residents. The natives are called Tejones and the town's neighbors in Alfarnate are Palancos.

It is located near the Sierra del Jobo in the northwest and the Sierra de Alhama in the east in the mountainous region of Axarquía.

References

External links
 

Municipalities in the Province of Málaga